Willem Frederik Hesselink (8 February 1878 – 1 December 1973) was a Dutch football player and one of the founders of local club Vitesse Arnhem in 1892. He was known for his blue woolen cap, which he seemed to wear day and night, and was nicknamed the Cannon, although he was also referred to as the Doctor because of his doctorate in chemistry.

Career
In 1890, Hesselink had been part of an attempt to get a cricket club off the ground in Arnhem and two years later he was one of the founders of Vitesse Arnhem. Cricket was the initial activity of choice but football took over quickly and Hesselink was soon the star of the team. Hesselink also excelled in athletics, holding several national records including the long jump. A team made up of him and his brothers became national champions in tug of war.

In 1899, he made the move to HVV and won the national championship twice. In 1900, Hesselink was a member of the HVV side that participated in the first edition of the Coupe Van der Straeten Ponthoz, regarded by many as the first-ever European club trophy. In the tournament, he scored one goal in the first round in an 8–1 trashing of hosts Léopold FC. He also featured in the final which ended in a 1–2 loss to RAP.

In 1903, Hesselink moved to Munich to study Philosophy and Chemistry and joined FC Bayern Munich. Hesselink became Bayern's first international star. In three years he would grow out to be their star player, manager and chairman. Despite playing for FC Bayern Munich, during the years 1902-1905, he would still regularly play games for Vitesse Arnhem. In January 1906 Hesselink left Munich, leaving a club that had grown considerably in his time at the helm in the hands of Kurt Müller, and returned to the Netherlands. Hesselink continued his footballing career, rejoining Vitesse Arnhem and later becoming treasurer and president.

International career
In 1905 he started in the first-ever home match of the Netherlands national football team, a 4-0 victory against Belgium. Some historians attribute one of the goals scored to him.

Personal life
Over the years he built up a colourful curriculum vitae including doctorates in chemistry and philosophy, becoming director of the Keuringsdienst van Waren, being expert witness in several murder trials, founding a laboratory, and writing several health books.

His thesis on the secrets of Port wine made on the banks of the Douro has proved to stand the tests of time and is still quoted regularly.

He died in December 1973 aged 95.

Honours

Club
HVV 
Dutch championship:
Champions (2): 1899–1900 and 1900–01

Coupe Van der Straeten Ponthoz:
Runner-up (1): 1900

References

1878 births
1973 deaths
Dutch footballers
Dutch expatriate footballers
Dutch football chairmen and investors
Netherlands international footballers
FC Bayern Munich board members
FC Bayern Munich managers
FC Bayern Munich footballers
Expatriate footballers in Germany
Dutch expatriate sportspeople in Germany
SBV Vitesse players
Footballers from Arnhem
Dutch expatriate football managers
Dutch football managers
Expatriate football managers in Germany
Association football forwards